Lord Havok is a fictional character, a DC Comics supervillain, part of the supervillain team called the Extremists. He is a genius equipped with a powered armor. Lord Havok first appeared in Justice League Europe #15 (June 1990).

Fictional character biography
As told in a flashback in Justice League Quarterly #3 (Summer 1991), the man who would become Lord Havok was originally one of five terrorists on Angor, an Earth-like world in a parallel universe. The terrorists had captured an experimental nuclear weapon and threatened to use it against the Justifiers, the primary superhero team on Angor. When the device exploded, the five terrorists were turned into the superpowered Extremists. Lord Havok and the Extremists then launch Angor's entire nuclear arsenal, starting a nuclear holocaust that eventually kills all life on Angor (with the exception of Dreamslayer, who is shunted into another dimension).

In Justice League Europe #15, Lord Havok and the Extremists manage to find a way into the universe of the JLE, and attempt to take over Earth.  In Justice League Europe #18, Lord Havok and his fellow villains are revealed to be robot duplicates of the original villains, created by theme park owner Mitch Wacky. The JLE bring Wacky to their Earth, where he quickly deactivates the robots.

Lord Havok's form returns, thanks to the manipulations of Dreamslayer and the enslavement of Mitch Wacky (who is killed for his troubles). Despite another defeat by the Justice League, Havok and now his other soldiers would return one more time, only to be stopped by Power Girl and the Linda Danvers-Supergirl.

Pre-Infinite Crisis, JLI establisher Maxwell Lord died but Kilgore, Flash's computer program villain, recreated him as a cyborg in the image of Lord Havok. This led to a continuation of Maxwell Lord's on/off villain status but this had been dropped sometime after altogether as the plot. In Countdown to Infinite Crisis and subsequent OMAC Project mini-series, an inexplicably wholly human Maxwell Lord took part in a plot to foil earth's heroes. DC editors confirmed that the previous continuity tying in Maxwell Lord with Lord Havok has been disregarded as non-canon. However, the Booster Gold series has now taken the idea to explain Lord's fall from grace: he was intent on recovering his lost humanity and suffered through months of painful, illegal surgeries to remove the cybernetic parts and restore human pieces to his body. This process was what drove Lord to fear and shun all metahumans.

Earth-8
Following Infinite Crisis and 52, another universe's Lord Havok and the Extremists are located on Earth-8, now under virtual global control by the United States of Angor, apart from an ominous "Russian wasteland", known as Slovekia, in which the Extremists reside. In Countdown #29, they capture Jason Todd, Donna Troy, Kyle Rayner, and "Bob" the Monitor, but are distracted by the arrival of Bob's overzealous brother, who attempts to kill the captives. Not long after, the Extremists are offered membership in Monarch's army. Though Havok violently refuses at first, he later agrees, and becomes Monarch's second-in-command. The Extremists are featured in a 6-part miniseries, which ties in with Countdown. In #1, the origin of Havok and the new Extremists is revealed; they were superbeings refusing to submit to the Metahuman Act, a government mandate requiring all Metahumans to submit to government control. After Havok's refusal, Monarch begins destroying places of great importance to the Extremists, which Havok dismisses as "acceptable losses", much to the chagrin of the Extremists.

In #6, Havok's origin is revealed; Alexi Nikolai was born the son of the czar of Russia. There were complications in the delivery, and he was born disfigured. His father, disgusted by his son, attempted to kill him, but was stopped by his wife, who later sent Alexi away to escape the czar's wrath. As he grew, Alexi developed a talent for designing machines and androids, and in college even created a malleable liquid-metal skin that he could control with his mind. Some time later, Alexi's father discovered that his wife had been sending Alexi money, and killed her. Angered at the loss of the one person who he loved, Alexi returned to his homeland, and used his new technology to kill his father. He then gives the Russian people 24 hours to evacuate before massive devices of his own invention eradicate Russia.

As the Meta-Militia and Monarch's forces attack the Extremists' headquarters, Havok reveals his trap: he has purposefully let the attacking metahumans into the base to lure them into a power-nullifying chamber. After decimating all but Monarch and Americommando (who is apprehended by Bluejay, who rebelled against the Meta-Militia), Havok agreed to join Monarch's forces.

In Countdown to Final Crisis #17, the Extremists are involved in Monarch's attack on Earth-51. In #13, Monarch's armor is breached by Superman-Prime and the entire Universe 51 is annihilated, however LHAE #6 reveals that Havok was able to siphon away a small amount of Monarch's power, allowing him to teleport away the Extremists and himself to a new base of operations within Angor's moon, a split second before Universe 51 was destroyed. Havok then reveals his intent to conquer the different worlds of the Multiverse.

The Multiversity
During The Multiversity storyline, a new version of Lord Havok appears on Earth 8. He claims to be the "greatest creation" of Frank Future, a Mister Fantastic pastiche, seeking to gather together the Omni-Gauntlets, the Genesis Egg and the Lightning-Axe of Wundajin (a Thor pastiche). He is seemingly killed by Deadeye, a Hawkeye pastiche.

DC Rebirth
A new incarnation of Lord Havok and the Extremists appears in Saratoga and battles Batman's Justice League before retreating to the Eastern European nation of Kravia, where on Angor Lord Havok was a prince before being passed over by his father. The Kravia of Earth is in turmoil due to a collapse of leadership, and Lord Havok retakes the country by offering them strength through his leadership. When Batman and the JLA arrive to confront the Extremists, they are forced to leave by soldiers acting under orders from the Kravian government who have voted to accept Lord Havok as ruler. The JLA then offer assistance to Kravian freedom fighters, and while Lord Havok is intimidating neighbouring nations to bring them under his rule, the Justice League confronts the Extremists in the various Kravian cities they are terrorizing.

Powers and abilities
Lord Havok wears a suit of cybernetic armor with built-in high-tech weapons. The armor gives him protection from physical and energy attacks, enhanced strength and endurance, can generate energy blasts and force fields, and has a built-in radar system to detect unseen threats and has targeting systems.

The Earth-8 version has an armor made from some kind of liquid metal, able to react to his thoughts and morph into blades and guns. Apparently, he also learned how to use "backwards speech" to effect magic in this world.

The Rebirth Lord Havok's armor is resistant to control from Dr. Diehard and Lord Havok refers to it as his 'skin'.  He also wields the Lightning-Axe of Wundajin and the shield of  Crusader.

In other media 
 Lord Havok appears in the Justice League Unlimited episode "Shadow of the Hawk", along with the other Extremists when they attacked a city. He was defeated by Batman who threw a bomb in his mouth.

References

DC Comics supervillains
Characters created by Keith Giffen
Comics characters introduced in 1990